Paul George Wakefield (born 6 March 1957) is a French former cricketer. A left-handed batsman and leg spin bowler, he represented the France national cricket team at the 2001 ICC Trophy, having previously played minor counties cricket for Cheshire County Cricket Club.

Career

Wakefield played for Cheshire in the Minor Counties Championship from 1975 until 1990, also playing one List A match for them against Kent in the 1983 Nat-West Trophy. He also played for Northamptonshire second XI in 1976 and for Worcestershire second XI in 1979.

He moved to France in 1994, and began playing for their national cricket team two years later. Amongst his matches for France include the 2000 European Championship in Glasgow and two matches in the 2001 ICC Trophy in Canada against Malaysia and Uganda.

References

1957 births
Living people
Cricketers from Cheshire
French cricketers
Cheshire cricketers
Sportspeople from Crewe
English cricketers